Julius Arnold (19 August 1835 – 3 February 1915) was a German pathologist born in Zurich. He was the son of anatomist Friedrich Arnold (1803–1890).

He studied medicine at the Universities of Heidelberg, Prague, Vienna and Berlin, where he was a student of Rudolf Virchow (1821–1902). In 1859 he became a doctor of medicine, and in 1866 he became a professor of pathological anatomy and director of the institute of pathology at Heidelberg. Arnold was the author of 120 articles in the fields of histology and pathological anatomy.

With Austrian pathologist, Hans Chiari, his name is lent to a condition known as Arnold–Chiari malformation, a disorder that takes place when the cerebellar tonsils and the medulla oblongata protrude through the foramen magnum into the spinal canal, without displacing the lower brain stem. Arnold described his pathological findings associated with the disorder from an infant who died shortly after delivery. He published his account of the disorder in an 1894 paper titled "Myelocyste, Transposition von Gewebskeimen und Sympodie". In 1907, two of Arnold's students coined the eponym of "Arnold–Chiari malformation" in honor of the two scientists.

Arnold died in 1915 in Heidelberg.

Selected works 
 Anatomische Beiträge zu der Lehre von den Schusswunden, Heidelberg 1873 – Anatomical contributions associated with gunshot wounds.
 Untersuchungen über Staubinhalation und Staubmetastase, Leipzig 1885 – Studies on dust inhalation and metastasis.
 Über den Kampf des menschlichen Körpers mit den Bakterien, Heidelberg 1888 – On the struggle of the human body with bacteria.

See also
 Pathology
 List of pathologists

References 

1835 births
1915 deaths
19th-century German physicians
German pathologists
Academic staff of Heidelberg University
German people of Swiss descent